The 1926 Giro di Lombardia was the 22nd edition of the Giro di Lombardia cycle race and was held on 31 October 1926. The race started and finished in Milan. The race was won by Alfredo Binda.

General classification

References

1926
Giro di Lombardia
Giro di Lombardia